Cavite, officially the Province of Cavite (Chavacano: Provincia de Cavite), is a province in the Philippines located in the Calabarzon region in Luzon.  Located on the southern shores of Manila Bay and southwest of Manila, it is one of the most industrialized and fastest-growing provinces in the Philippines. As of 2020, it has a population of 
4,344,829, making it the most populated province in the country if the independent cities of Cebu are excluded from Cebu's population figure.

The de facto capital and seat of the government of the province is Trece Martires, although Imus is the official (de jure) capital while the City of Dasmariñas is the largest city in the province.

For over 300 years, the province played an important role in both the country's colonial past and eventual fight for independence, earning it the title "Historical Capital of the Philippines". It became the cradle of the Philippine Revolution, which led to the renouncement of Spanish colonial control, finally culminating in the Philippine Declaration of Independence on June12, 1898 in Kawit. The old provincial capital, Cavite City also hosted docks for the Manila galleon, becoming an essential part of commerce between Asia and Latin America.

Originally an agricultural province, its northern cities of Bacoor, Imus, and Dasmariñas (with a combined population of 1,864,560 at the 2020 Census) are now suburbs of Manila due to increasing urbanization in the late 1900s. This province forms part of the Greater Manila Area.

Etymology
The name "Cavite" comes from the Hispanicized form of kawit or it may be a corruption of kalawit, Tagalog words for "hook", in reference to the small hook-shaped peninsula jutting out to Manila Bay. The name originally applied to the peninsula, Cavite La Punta (now Cavite City) and the adjacent lowland coastal area of Cavite Viejo (now Kawit).

Another theory proposes that the name is a Hispanicized form of kabit, Tagalog for "joined", "connected", or "attached", referring to the peninsula's topographical relation to the mainland. Edmund Roberts, in his 1821 memoir, stated that the "natives" called it Caveit due to the "crooked point of land extending into the sea".

History

Pre-Hispanic period
The present Cavite City was once a mooring place for Chinese junks that came to trade with the settlements around Manila Bay. The land was formerly known as "Tangway". Archeological evidence in coastal areas shows prehistorical settlements. According to local folklore, the earliest settlers of Cavite came from China or Vietnam.

Spanish colonial period
The Spanish colonizers who arrived in the late 16th century saw the unusual tongue of land jutting out on Manila Bay and saw its deep waters as the main staging ground where they could launch their bulky galleons. It would later become the most important port linking the colony to the outside world through the Manila-Acapulco Galleon trade. In 1571, Spanish colonizers established the port and City of Cavite and fortified the settlement as a first line of defense for the city of Manila. Galleons were built and fitted at the port and many Chinese merchants settled in the communities of Bacoor and Kawit, opposite the Spanish city to trade silks, porcelain and other oriental goods.

"A defensive curtained wall was constructed the length of Cavite's western side," beginning from the entrance, "La Estanzuela", and continuing to the end of the peninsula, "Punta de Rivera", with the eastern shore unprotected by a wall.  Cavite contained government offices, churches, mission buildings, Spanish homes, Fort San Felipe and the Rivera de Cavite shipyard.  Docks were in place to construct galleons and galleys, but without a dry dock, ships were repaired by careening along the beach.

Fort San Felipe, La Fuerza de San Felipe, was built between 1609 and 1616.  This quadrilateral structure of curtained walls, with bastions at the corners, contained 20 cannons facing the seashore.  Three infantry companies, 180 men each, plus 220 Pampangan infantry, garrisoned the fort.

The galleons Espiritu Santo and San Miguel, plus six galleys were constructed between 1606 and 1616.  From 1729 to 1739, "the main purpose of the Cavite shipyard was the construction and outfitting of the galleons for the Manila to Acapulco trade run."

The vibrant mix of traders, Spanish seamen from Spain and its Latin-American colonies, as well as local residents, gave rise to the use of pidgin Spanish called Chabacano. A great number of Mexican men had settled at Cavite, spread throughout Luzon, and had integrated with the local Philippine population. Some of these Mexicans became Tulisanes (Bandits) that led peasant revolts against Spain. Mexicans weren't the only Latin Americans in Cavite, as there were also a fair number of other Latin Americans, one such was the Puerto Rican, Alonso Ramirez, who became a sailor in Cavite, and published the first Latin American novel called "Infortunios de Alonso Ramirez"

In 1614, the politico-military jurisdiction of Cavite was established. As with many other provinces organized during the Spanish colonial era, Cavite City, the name of the capital, was applied to the whole province, Cavite. The province covered all the present territory except for the town of Maragondon, which used to belong to the Corregimiento of Mariveles. Maragondon was ceded to Cavite in 1754 when Bataan province was created from Pampanga province. Within Maragondon is a settlement established in 1660 by Christian Papuan exiles brought in by the Jesuits from Ternate in the Maluku Islands, and named this land Ternate after their former homeland.

Owing to its military importance, Cavite had been attacked by foreigners in their quest to conquer Manila and the Philippines. The Dutch made a surprise attack on the city in 1647, pounding the port incessantly, but were repulsed. In 1672, the British occupied the port during their two-year control in the Philippines.

In the 17th century, encomiendas (Spanish Royal land grants) were given in Cavite and Maragondon to Spanish conquistadores and their families.  The religious orders began acquiring these lands, with some donated, enlarging vast haciendas (estates) in Cavite during the 18th and 19th centuries, enriching themselves. These haciendas became the source of bitter conflicts between the friar orders and Filipino farmers and pushed a number of Caviteños to live as outlaws. This opposition to the friar orders was an important factor that drove many Cavite residents to support reform, and later, independence.

In 1872, Filipinos launched their revolt against Spain. Three Filipino priests—Jose Burgos, Mariano Gomez and Jacinto Zamora—were implicated in the Cavite mutiny when 200 Filipinos staged a rebellion within Spanish garrisons. On August 28, 1896, when the revolution against Spain broke out, Cavite became a bloody theater of war. Led by Emilio Aguinaldo, Caviteños made lightning raids on Spanish headquarters, and soon liberated the entire province through the Battle of Alapan. Aguinaldo commanded the Revolution to its successful end – the proclamation of the First Republic of the Philippines on June 12, 1898, in Kawit.

During the Spanish–American War, American forces attacked the Spanish squadron in Cavite. The Spanish defeat marked the end of Spanish rule in the country. A captured Spanish cannon from the Cavite arsenal now sits in Village Green Park in Winnetka, Illinois,  United States of America.

World War II: Japanese occupation and liberation

In May 1942, after the fall of Bataan and Corregidor Island, the Japanese Imperial forces occupied Cavite and made garrisons in each town of the province.

After surviving the Bataan Death March and released from Capas, Tarlac concentration camp United States Army Forces in the Far East (USAFFE) Col. Mariano Castañeda, returned to Cavite and secretly organized the guerilla forces in the province.

The Japanese authorities pressured him to accept the position as Provincial Governor of Cavite, he refused many times over until his excuses did not work, much against his will he was forced to accept the position by the Japanese, and by thinking that it would be beneficial to further organize the resistance movement as Governor by day and a guerilla commander by night. Eventually, the Japanese discovered his guerilla connection and raided his house in the attempt to capture him, but he escaped along with Col. Lamberto Javalera by swimming the Imus river up to Salinas, Bacoor and finally joined his comrades in the field in Neneng, the General Headquarters of the Fil American Cavite Guerilla Forces (FACGF) located in Dasmariñas.

At this time due to his organizational skills the FACGF raised a regiment in each of the administrative units and also created attached special battalions Overall, 3 special battalions, 1 medical battalion, 1 signal company, 1 hospital unit, Division GHQ and Staff were raised to provide administrative and combat support. Later on, the FACGF, with a peak of 14,371 Enlisted Men and 1,245 officers, grew into a formidable force to take on the omnipresent rule of the Japanese in the province. At its peak the force contained 14 infantry regiments:

1st Infantry Regiment, Imus (Col. Lorenzo Saulog)
2nd Infantry Regiment, Bacoor (Col. Francisco Guererro)
3rd Infantry Regiment, Silang (Col. Dominador Kiamson) 
4th Infantry Regiment, Dasmariñas (Col. Estanislao Mangubat Carungcong)
5th Infantry Regiment, Barangay Anabu, Imus (Col. Raymundo Paredes)
6th Infantry Regiment, Cavite City (Col. Amado Soriano)
7th Infantry Regiment, Alfonso (Col. Angeles Hernais)
8th Infantry Regiment, Naic (Col. Emilio Arenas)
9th Infantry Regiment, Mendez (Col. Maximo Rodrigo)  
10th Infantry Regiment Kawit (Col. Hugo Vidal) 
11th Infantry Regiment Imus (Col. Maximo Reyes)
12th Infantry Regiment, Amadeo (Col. Daniel Mediran) 
13th Infantry Regiment, Rosario (Col. Ambrosio Salud)
14th Infantry Regiment, Brgy. Paliparan, Dasmariñas (Col. Emiliano De La Cruz)

On January 31, 1945, the liberation of the province of Cavite started with the combined forces of the American 11th Airborne Division under General Swing and Col. Hildebrand and the valiant Caviteño guerilleros of the Fil-American Cavite Guerilla Forces, which liberated the province of Cavite from the Japanese occupiers, and protected at all costs the National Highway 17 from Tagaytay to Las Piñas that serve as the vital supply route of the 11th Airborne Division, paving the way towards the road to the bitter but victorious Battle of Manila.

Postwar era 
The economic growth of the country began to creep its way to the province following the end of the Second World War and the restoration of independence. Given its proximity to Manila, the province soon began to feel a transformation into an economic provider of food and industrial goods not just for Metro Manila but for the whole of the country. In 1954, Trece Martires City was created out as a planned capital city from portions of Tanza, Indang, Naic, and General Trias. Despite the transfer of capital status to Imus in 1979, it retains many offices of the provincial government, acting thus as the de facto capital of the province. Also, Tagaytay's high location and cool temperatures would enable it to become a secondary summer capital and a vacation spot especially during the Christmas season, given its proximity to the Manila area.

The economy of Cavite remained largely agricultural during the decades after the war, from the 1940s to the 1980s, with attempts to create industrial estates in the early 1970s largely falling flat in light of the Crony Capitalism and economic crises of the late 1970s and early 1980s.

During the Marcos dictatorship 

The Philippines' gradual postwar recovery took a turn for the worse in the late 1960s and early 1970s, with the 1969 Philippine balance of payments crisis being one of the early landmark events. Economic analysts generally attribute this to the ramp-up on loan-funded government spending to promote Ferdinand Marcos’ 1969 reelection campaign, although Marcos blamed the 1968 formation of the Communist Party of the Philippines as the reason for the social unrest of the period.  There were clashes between government and communist protesters in the rural areas and the western highlands of Cavite.

Another conflict faced by the Philippines throughout the last part of the 20th century had some of its roots in Cavite - the moro conflict, which was largely sparked by outrage in the wake of exposes about the Jabidah Massacre.  The exposes told the story of how a group of moro men were recruited by the military for Operation Merdeka, Marcos' secret plan to invade Sabah and reclaim it from Malaysia, and trained them on the island of Corregidor, which is administered by Cavite province. When for various reasons the recruits decided that they no longer wanted to follow their officers' orders, their officers allegedly shot all the recruits to death, with only one survivor managing to live by feigning death. The exposes angered the Philippines' Muslim minority enough to trigger the Moro conflict, eventually leading to the creation of the Bangsamoro Autonomous Region in Muslim Mindanao (BARMM).

In 1972 - one year before the expected end of his last constitutionally allowed term as president in 1973 - Ferdinand Marcos placed the Philippines Martial Law. This allowed Marcos to remain in power for fourteen more years, during which Cavite went through many social and economic ups and downs.

The human rights abuses, crony capitalism, propagandistic construction projects, and personal expensive lifestyles of the Marcos Family prompted opposition from various Filipino citizens despite the risks of arrest and torture.  Among the prominent Caviteño oppositionists were Armed Forces Colonel Bonifacio Gillego, who spoke out against human rights abuses by the military and later exposed the fact that Ferdinand Marcos had faked most of his military medals. Another was Roman Catholic Priest Fr. Joe Dizon, who led led protest actions against government corruption and human rights abuses during martial law in the Philippines, political dynasties, and the pork barrel system and brought social issues to the attention of the Catholic Bishops Conference of the Philippines. Both Gillego and Dizon are honored at the Philippines' Bantayog ng mga Bayani, which honors the martyrs and heroes who fought authoritarian rule under Marcos. Other Caviteños honored there include Philippine Navy Captain Danilo Vizmanos, musician Benjie Torralba, activists Modesto "Bong" Sison, Florencio Pesquesa, and Artemio Celestial Jr., and Nemesio Prudente who would later become president of the Polytechnic University of the Philippines.

Presidential Decree No. 1 of 1972 grouped the Provinces of the Philippines into administrative regions, and Cavite was organized into Region IV.  The Luzon mainland provinces of this region - Cavite, Laguna, Batangas, Rizal, and Quezon - were prioritized for industrialization, and large amounts of agricultural land in Cavite were acquired for conversion into industrial estates throughout the 1970s and early 1980s. However, these government-owned or corporate-owned estates were unsuccessful at first, and many of them became unused lands well into the Philippine economic collapse of the early 1980s. Old Cavite residents who were primarily engaged in agriculture were displaced and left the province, replaced by a rising number of residents from the capital region.

Rosario was the first Cavite town to have several large industrial projects, including a refinery set up by FilOil Refinery Corporation. An influx of new residents into the north and west parts of Carmona led to the separation of these portions into a new town, General Mariano Alvarez, in 1981.  The migration had begun in 1968, when the Carmona Resettlement Project was established under the People's Homesite and Housing Corporation (PHHC) - an effort to resettle illegal settlers from around the Quezon Memorial Park area in Quezon City.  A site in Carmona was selected, and by the mid-1970s, the resettlement area soon attracted poor and middle class migrants alike from Quezon City, Manila, Makati and Parañaque. Their clamor to have a municipality of their own resulted in the creation of General Mariano Alvarez. Bacoor, given its proximity to Metro Manila, saw the building of the first residential villages during this time, providing accommodation the rising number of workers from the nearby capital.

One geographical feature of Cavite, Mount Sungay, was significantly altered in 1979 when First Lady Imelda Marcos ordered the construction of the Palace in the Sky, a mansion originally intended as a guesthouse for former California Governor Ronald Reagan (who never arrived). This drastically reduced the height of the mountain, which had once been a landmark that helped guide sailors into Manila bay. The mansion remained unfinished after the People Power Revolution in 1986 that toppled the dictatorship of President Ferdinand Marcos. The new government renamed it the People's Park in the Sky, to show the excesses of the ousted regime.

Contemporary history 
In 2002 Region IV was split into two parts: Region IV-A, known as Calabarzon; and Region IV-B, known as Mimaropa. Cavite was made part of Region IV-A, which is also known as the known as the Southern Tagalog Mainland.

Geography

Cavite is surrounded by Laguna province to the east, Metro Manila to the northeast, and Batangas province to the south. To the west lies the South China Sea. It is located within the Greater Manila Area, not to be confused with adjacent Metro Manila, the defined capital region.

Cavite is the second-smallest province (the Province of Rizal being the smallest) in the Calabarzon region.

Topography and slope

Situated at the entrance of Manila Bay, Cavite is characterized by rolling hinterlands punctuated by hills; shoreline fronting Manila Bay at sea level; and rugged portion at the boundary with Batangas where the Dos Picos mountains are located. The province has two mountain ranges.

Cavite is divided into four physiographical areas, namely: the lowest lowland area, lowland area, the central hilly area and the upland mountainous area.

 The lowest lowland area is the coastal plain in particular. These are the cities of Cavite, Bacoor and the municipalities of Kawit, Noveleta, Rosario, northern part of Carmona and eastern part of Ternate.
 The lowland area consists of the coastal and alluvial plains. The alluvial plain can be found in the city of Imus and southern part of General Trias. Into these municipalities forms the transition area between the coastal plain and the central hilly area. It also covers some areas of Bacoor, Carmona, Kawit, Noveleta, Rosario, and Tanza.
 The third topography type is the central hilly area, generally found on the mountain foot slope. It forms the rolling tuffaceous plateau. This topography includes steep hills, ridges and elevated inland valley. Its ground slope ranges from 0.5 to 2%. The cities of Trece Martires and Dasmariñas and the municipalities of General Emilio Aguinaldo, General Mariano Alvarez, western part of Ternate, northern parts of Amadeo, Indang, Silang, Magallanes and Maragondon have this kind of topography.
 The last topography type is upland mountainous area, found in the city of Tagaytay and the municipalities of Alfonso, Mendez, southern parts of Amadeo, Indang, Silang, Magallanes and Maragondon. They are situated at a very high elevation above  with slopes of more than 2%. The prominence of the mountain was leveled in half during the construction of People's Park in the Sky during the Marcos administration.

Islands

 Balot Island, located at the mouth of Ternate River
 Caballo Island
 Corregidor
 El Fraile Island
 Carabao Island
 La Monja Island, located west of Corregidor
 Limbones Island, located off Maragondon coast near Batangas border
 Pulo ni Burunggoy (now Island Cove Resort; formerly Covelandia) located in Bacoor Bay
 Santa Amalia Island, located Northwest of Corregidor

Geology 
The Mines and Geosciences Bureau's (MGB) geologic map of Cavite in 1987, reveals that Taal Tuff underlies the majority of the province (all of Cavite except for Imus City, Bacoor City, Rosario, Noveleta, Kawit, and Cavite City as well as portions of Naic, Carmona, General Mariano Alvarez, General Emilio Aguinaldo, Maragondon, Magallanes, Ternate, Tanza, General Trias, and Dasmariñas). The Taal Tuff consists of fine to medium-grained basaltic tuffs and minor flows, including volcanic breccia and cinders.

According to Corby and others (1951), Taal Tuff is composed of thinly laminated white ash and stringers (thin, discontinuous rock layers) of black cinders. No coarse agglomerates and breccia tuffs resembling the Guadalupe Tuff (now referred to as the Diliman Tuff part of the Guadalupe Formation) were seen. It extends across Batangas, Cavite, and Laguna and has a maximum thickness of more than 400 meters (Teves, 1954).

A newly designated stratigraphic unit, the Mataas na Gulod Volcanic Complex (MGB, 2004), resembles the Taal Tuff and its distribution region in Cavite and Batangas. Basalt, andesite, breccia, pyroclastic rocks, and lahar make up its lithology (Peña, 2008). Currently, there seems to be no information on when Taal Tuff will be updated.

Diliman Tuff underlies almost half of Tanza and General Trias, a part of Naic and Dasmariñas, and the whole of Bacoor and Imus. Alat Conglomerate is the lowest member of the Guadalupe Formation, whereas Diliman Tuff is the upper member. Flat-lying and moderately to thinly bedded, the Diliman Tuff is composed of fine-grained vitric tuff, welded pyroclastic breccia, and minor fine- to medium-grained tuffaceous sandstone. The matrix of the glassy tuff contains minute quantities of black mafic minerals, pumiceous, and scoriaceous materials.

Most mountain ridges in Ternate and Maragondon are composed of Lobo Agglomerate, whereas Magallanes has just a few minor areas. Massive agglomerates and volcanic breccia composed of well-cemented andesite and dacite clasts set in a fine matrix of the same composition with modest interbedded and intercalated lapilli tuffs define this rock type. It is identical to the Sampiro Agglomerates of dela Cruz and Abadilla (1958) as well as the conglomerate of Cruz and Mantaring (1969) (MGB, 1987).

The Lobo Agglomerate is now considered a part of the Pinamucan Formation. It is situated on the top horizon of the Pinamucan Formation (Avila, 1980). The Pinamucan Formation is an interbedded series of conglomerate, sandstone, fine-grained tuffaceous clastics, tuff, and shale that may be found in Batangas, along the upper Pinamucan, upper Calumpit, and middle Lobo rivers. The conglomerate is slightly indurated and composed of well-sorted pebbles of andesite, diorite, and metasediments embedded in a sandy tuffaceous matrix (MGB, 1987; Pea, 2008). This formation appears as a single patch across the border between Maragondon and Magallanes.

In some mountain areas of Maragondon and Magallanes, the Talahib Andesite is observed. It consists mainly of andesite flows interbedded with thin layers of pyroclastic and bedded tuff (MGB, 1987). In addition, the andesite is vesicular, amygdaloidal, flow banded, and displays indications of propylitization (epidote and chlorite were seen). Also discovered were silicification and pyritization, although only locally along shear zones. The Talahib Andesite (Avila, 1980) is equivalent to the Nasugbu Volcanic Complex (Malicdem and others, 1963), the Batangas Extrusives and Pyroclastics (Malicdem and others, 1963), the Batangas Volcanics (Corby and others, 1951), and the Banoy Volcanics (Wolfe and others, 1980).

Quaternary Alluvium was abundant in the coastal areas, alluvial plains, and a large portion of the low-lying areas of Ternate, Maragondon, Carmona, General Mariano Alvarez, Naic, Tanza, Rosario, Noveleta, Kawit, Cavite City, Imus, General Trias, and Bacoor. It consists of coastal and river deposits of unconsolidated sediments, including sand and gravel.

Land resources and distribution

Cavite's land resources are categorized into two: forest lands and alienable and disposable lands. Forest lands are being maintained as they play a great role in the ecological balance of the province aside from the fact that they are home to numerous flora and fauna that needs to be protected and preserved. Correspondingly, the alienable and disposable lands are the built-up areas as well as production areas. These lands are intended for urban, economic and demographic developments.

Forest lands
Cavite province lies in the western monsoon forest zone. This location is very beneficial for the formation of tropical rainforests, which are characteristically made through natural vegetation. These forest areas were categorized as Protected Landscape under the National Integrated Protected Area System (NIPAS) and the rest, unclassified forest (Non-NIPAS). The park lies at the border of Cavite and Batangas and encompasses three peaks, Palay-Palay, Pico de Loro and Mataas na Gulod. The five unclassified forests are found along Tagaytay Ridge, Maragondon, Magallanes, Ternate and Alfonso. The other mountain peaks in the province are Mt. Buntis, Mt. Nagpatong, Mt. Hulog and Mt. Gonzales (Mt. Sungay).

Cavite's forest provides an abundance of different forest products. Bamboo, a member of the grass family, is one of the most available forest products found in the municipalities of Ternate, Magallanes, Maragondon and General Aguinaldo throughout the year.

Alienable and disposable lands
These lands are being used in various ways, either for agriculture, residences, open areas, etc.  Based on the Cavite Provincial Physical Framework Plan 2005–2010, Cavite's alienable and disposable lands are further classified into production lands and built-up areas. Production lands in Cavite are intended for agriculture, fishery, and mining. On the other hand, built-up areas are mainly for residential areas, commercial, industrial and tourism areas.

Production land-use
Majority of production land-use is for agriculture. Considering that 50.33% of the total provincial land area is engaged in agriculture, it can be generalized that in spite of rapid urbanization in the province, Cavite remains to have an agricultural economy that makes food security attainable. Some of the major crops being produced in the province are rice, corn, coffee, coconuts, cut flowers and vegetables.

Included in the agricultural land use are livestock farms that range from piggery, poultry, goat and cattle farms. The climatic suitability of Cavite makes the province ideal for integrated farming, having crops and livestock raising in one farm.

Fishery is also another major component of the agricultural sector. Having rich marine resources and long coastlines, the province is home to numerous fishery activities providing livelihood to many Caviteños. In some lowland and even upland areas, fishery, in the form of fish ponds are also producing a large amount of fish products. Some areas in Cavite are also engaged in fish processing and production of fish products like fish sauce.

Mining is the third component of production land-use in the province. As of 2009, there are 15 mining and quarrying areas operating in Cavite. Extraction includes filling materials, gravel, and sand.

Built-up areas
The built-up areas are mainly composed of residential and industrial sites. This also includes commercial and business areas where commerce is transpiring. According to the 2007 Census of Population and Housing by the Philippine Statistics Authority, there are 611,450 occupied housing units in Cavite.

Moreover, according to the Housing and Land-Use Regulatory Board, there are around 1,224 housing subdivisions with issued license to sell in the province until 2009 which occupies an area of 9,471 hectares.

Meanwhile, the industrial sector also develops rapidly in the province. Tourism establishments are also considered built-up areas such as golf courses, leisure farms, resorts and the likes.

Water resources
The hydrological network of the province is composed of seven major rivers and its tributaries. These river systems generally flows from the highlands of Tagaytay and Maragondon to Manila Bay. Numerous springs, waterfalls and rivers found in the upland areas of the province, have been developed for tourism.  In the lowland areas, hundreds of artesian wells and deep wells provide water supply for both residential and irrigation purposes.

The communities located along the coast are Cavite City, Bacoor, Kawit, Noveleta, Rosario, Tanza, Naic, Maragondon, and Ternate. The richness of Cavite's coastal resources is a major producer of oysters and mussels. The fishing industry also produces shrimp and bangus (milkfish). The western coastline are lined with pale gray sand beaches popular with tourists. Thus, fishery and tourism contribute to the economic activity of the province.

Major rivers
These rivers are known to have various tributaries passing through the municipalities of the province:

Springs

Waterfalls

Soil properties

Cavite is composed of several soil types according to soil surveys conducted by the Bureau of Soils and Water Management (BSWM). Classification of soil types in a specific area is a very important consideration in identifying its most fitted land-use. This way, utmost productivity can be achieved.

The lowland area of Cavite is generally composed of Guadalupe clay and clay loam. It is characterized as coarse and granular when dry but sticky and plastic when wet. Its substratum is solid volcanic tuff. These types of soils are suited to lowland rice and corn while those in the upland are suited for orchard and pasture. Guadalupe clay adobes are abundant in the southern part of Bacoor and Imus bordering Dasmariñas. The soil is hard and compact and difficult to cultivate that makes it generally unsuitable for diverse cropping. It is very sticky when wet and granular when dry. Forage grass is advised for this type of soil. Hydrosol and Obando sand are found along Bacoor Bay. The shoreline of Rosario, Tanza, Naic and Ternate are lined with Guadalupe sand.

The central area principally consists of Magallanes loam with streaks of Magallanes clay loam of sandy texture. This is recommended for diversified farming such as the cultivation of upland rice, corn, sugarcane, vegetables, coconut, coffee, mangoes and other fruit trees. The steep phase should be forested or planted to root crops. The eastern side of Cavite consists of Carmona clay loam with streaks of Carmona clay loam steep phase and Carmona sandy clay loam. This type of soil is granular with tuffaceous material and concretions. It is hard and compact when dry, sticky and plastic when wet. This type of soil is planted to rice with irrigation or sugarcane without irrigation. Fruit trees such as mango, avocado and citrus are also grown in this type of soil. Guingua fine sandy loam is found along the lower part of Malabon and Alang-ilang River at Noveleta.

The type of soils that dominate the upland areas are Tagaytay loam and Tagaytay sandy loam with mountain soil undifferentiated found on the south-eastern side bordering Laguna province. Also on the southern tip are Magallanes clay and Mountain soil undifferentiated with interlacing of Magallanes clay loam steep phase. The Tagaytay loam contains fine sandy materials, moderately friable, and easy to work on when moist. In an undisturbed condition, it bakes and becomes hard when dry. About one-half of this soil type is devoted to upland rice and upland crops. On the other hand, Tagaytay sandy loam is friable and granular with considerable amount of volcanic sand and underlain by adobe clay. Mountain soil undifferentiated is forested with bamboos found in the sea coast. Cavite also has the Patungan sand characterized by pale gray to almost white sand with substratum of marine conglomerates which are found at Santa Mercedes in Maragondon and in some coastlines of Ternate.

Mineral resources and reserves

The greater parts of Cavite are composed of volcanic materials, tuff, cinders, basalt, breccias, agglomerate and interbeddings of shales, and sandstones. The dormant and active volcanoes (Taal) are within these volcanic areas and have been the sources of volcanic materials which form the Tagaytay Cuesta. The drainage systems are deeply entrenched in the tuffs, eroding thin interbedded sandstones and conglomerate rocks which are the sources of little reserves of sand and gravel in the larger stream. Adobe stone quarries also flourish in the tuff areas.

Cavite coastal areas have marl and conglomerate sedimentary rocks and some igneous rocks which are prominent in the high, mountainous regions of western part of the province. Black sands are found in Kawit while Noveleta has its own salt products. Magallanes has gravel deposits while reserves of sand and gravel materials are found in Alfonso, Carmona, Gen. Emilio Aguinaldo, Naic, Ternate, Maragondon and Silang.

Administrative divisions
Cavite comprises 16 municipalities and 7 cities:

Climate
Cavite belongs to Type 1 climate based on the Climate Map of the Philippines by the Philippine Atmospheric, Geophysical and Astronomical Services Administration (PAGASA). Being a Type 1, Cavite has two pronounced seasons – the dry season, which usually begins in November and ends in April, and the rainy season, which starts in May and ends in October. The Köppen Climate Classification sub-type for this climate is "Am" (Tropical Monsoon Climate).

Demographics

Cavite had a total population of 4,344,829 in the 2020 census, making it the most populous (if independent cities are excluded from Cebu), and the second most densely populated province in the country. The tremendous increase can be observed in the year 1990 when industrialization was introduced in the province. Investors established their businesses in different industrial estates that magnetized people to migrate to Cavite due to job opportunities the province offers. Another factor attributed to the increase of population is the mushrooming of housing subdivisions. Since Cavite is proximate to Metro Manila, people working in the metropolitan area choose to live in the province together with their families. Natural increase also contributes to the increase in population.

Among the cities and municipalities in Cavite, the city of Dasmariñas has the biggest population with 659,019 people while the municipality of Gen. Emilio Aguinaldo has registered the smallest population with 22,220 people.

Cavite is classified as predominantly urban having 90.69 percent of the population concentrated in the urban areas, while 9.21 percent of the population reside in the rural areas.

Religion

Christianity 
In line with national statistics, Christianity is the predominant faith in the province, composed of Catholics, Protestants, and other Independent Christian groups. The majority (70%) of the population are Roman Catholic.

Adherents of the Philippine Independent Church, also known as the Aglipayan Church, are particularly found in the towns where historically the Philippine Revolution and anti-clericalist sentiments are strong.

The Eastern Orthodox Church presence in Cavite province was a part of the Philippine Orthodox Church here in the Philippines under the jurisdiction of the Patriarchate of Moscow and its own Orthodox Diocese province in Southeast Asia the Diocese of the Philippines and Vietnam. Many Orthodox community lives throughout the province especially in the city of Tagaytay.

The strong presence of other Christian denominations and sects such as the mainline Protestant Evangelical Churches, Christian Fellowships and other Christian sects are also evident throughout the province. Chapels of the Iglesia ni Cristo also known as INC, The Church of Jesus Christ of Latter-day Saints, and the Seventh-day Adventist Church including its key  institutions such as the Adventist University of the Philippines and Adventist International Institute of Advanced Studies are in Cavite. Meanwhile, the Members Church of God International has established coordinating centers throughout the province and a local convention center situated in Biga, Silang, Cavite.

Islam 
With the influx of Filipino Muslim migrants from the Mindanao, local Caviteño Balik Islam or reverts, and some non-Filipino expats, their OFW spouses and children returning from Muslim countries, Sunni Islam of either the Shafii or Hanbali schools-of-thought has become evident in various areas of the province, and accounts for the majority of the non-Christian population.

Mosques, prayer halls, and  prayer rooms catering to the community exist in places where local Muslim Caviteños live and work; especially in the municipalities of Bacoor, Imus, Rosario, and Dasmariñas.

Interreligious dialogue and communal relations between the majority Christians and minority Muslims are peaceful and amicable, with some families consisting of both Christian and Muslim members.

Other faiths 
Non-Abrahamic faiths include native Tagalog anitism, animism, Sikhism, and Hinduism. Among the local Chinese and Chinese-Filipino communities, Taoism, Buddhism, and Confucianism are followed.

Languages
The main languages spoken are Tagalog, Chavacano and English. Due to the province of Metro Manila bordering Cavite to the south, a large number of people from farther provinces have migrated to Cavite, resulting in minor but significant usage of the Bicolano, Cebuano, Ilocano, Hiligaynon and Waray languages.

Chavacano in Cavite 
Chavacano or Chabacano is a Spanish-based creole language and known in linguistics as Philippine Creole Spanish. Chabacano is originally spoken by the majority of the Caviteños that lived in Cavite City and Ternate after the arrival of the Spaniards three centuries ago. The various groups in the area of different linguistic backgrounds adopted a pidgin language, with mostly Spanish vocabulary, in order to communicate with each other. As children grew up in Cavite with that pidgin as their native language, it evolved into a creole language.

Now used almost exclusively in Cavite City and coastal Ternate, Chabacano enjoyed its widest diffusion and greatest splendor in Spanish and American period of Filipino history, when newspapers and literary outputs flourished. Cavite Chabacano was spoken with relative ease because it was essentially a simplification of Castillan morphology patterned after the Tagalog syntax. Gradually and naturally, it acquired the sounds present in the Spanish phonological system. After World War II, creole Spanish speakers within the capital of the archipelago vanished. Around 30,000 Caviteños still speak Chabacano, mostly elderly speakers. The language is today taught in elementary schools in both Cavite City and Ternate as part of the K-12 national curriculum from the first to 3rd grades, building up a new generation of speakers and writers within the province.

Culture
Aside from the celebrations of town fiestas, the province of Cavite celebrates festivals as forms of thanksgiving for a bountiful harvest. Some of these festivals are also observed in honor of the historical legacies passed from one generation to another generation. In fact, the province fetes the renowned Kalayaan Festival which is given a great social importance in commemoration of the heroism of its people. The annual Fiesta de la Reina del Provincia de Cavite is a grandiose fiesta celebration in honor of the patroness of the province, the Nuestra Señora de la Soledad de Porta Vaga. The image is enshrined at San Roque Church in Cavite City. Her feastday is celebrated every 2nd and 3rd Sunday of November.

Traditions and fiesta celebrations include Mardicas, a war dance held in Ternate town. Karakol street dancing with a fluvial procession is usually held in coastal towns. There is also a pre-colonial ritual called the Sanghiyang as a form of thanksgiving and to heal the sick. Another cultural tradition is the Live via Crucis or Kalbaryo ni Hesus held during Holy Week.  The Maytinis or word prayer that is annually held in Kawit every December 24 before the beginning of the midnight Mass.

Festivals

Special events
Foundation Day
Cavite Province celebrates its foundation every March 10

Birthday of Gen. Emilio Aguinaldo
This is celebrated every March 22 in commemoration of the birth of the First President of the Republic.

Independence Day
This is celebrated every June 12 in Kawit as a re-enactment of the historic proclamation of Philippine independence at the mansion of Gen. Emilio Aguinaldo.

Economy

Agriculture
The province is predominantly an agriculture province. The province's economy is largely dependent on agriculture. Despite urbanization and industrialization, still, a significant number of inhabitants are engaged into agribusinesses. This is  bigger than that of the declared agricultural lands in 2008 (69,290.03 hectares).

The municipality of Maragondon has the biggest area intended for agriculture, accounts for 14.57% of the total provincial agricultural lands while Cavite City has no longer available land for agriculture related activities and industries. If based on total agricultural lands, we may say that the major players in agriculture in the province are Maragondon, Silang, Indang, Naic and Alfonso. Of the eight districts in the province, the top three with the widest agricultural area are District VII comprising 43,587.01 hectares or 61.85 percent of the total agricultural areas with 27,115 farmers followed by District VI with 17.40 percent or  having 8,701 farmers and District V comprising  with 10,295 farmers. The municipality of Silang has the most farmers. The municipality of Maragondon only ranks 3rd in terms of number of farmers. This can be attributed to highly mechanized operations and vast plantations of rice. The same is true with General Trias and Naic, known as the rice producing municipalities in Cavite. The number of farmers increased by 6.5% that corresponds to around 3,097 farmers. The increase in the number of farmers was due to worldwide recession which led to work displacement of some inhabitants. Silang is dominated by pineapple and coffee plantations as well as with cut flower production.

Industry and commerce
Cavite has twelve economic zones. The largest economic zone under development is located in General Trias, the PEC Industrial Park with 177 hectares intended for garments, textiles, semiconductors, food processing and pharmaceuticals.

Township Developments (Completed and Ongoing Projects)

 Vista City / Villar Land (Vista Land) 2,500 hectares  — Bacoor and Dasmariñas (shared with Las Piñas and Muntinlupa)
 Lancaster New City (PRO-Friends Inc.) 2,100 hectares — Imus, Kawit, General Trias and Tanza
 Aera (Ayala Land) 900 hectares — Carmona and Silang
 Vermosa (Ayala Land) 770 hectares — Imus and Dasmariñas
 Eagle Ridge Golf & Residential Estates (Sta. Lucia) 700 hectares — General Trias
 Riverpark (Federal Land and SM Development Corp.) 700 hectares — General Trias
 Southwoods City (Megaworld) 561 hectares — Carmona (shared with Biñan, Laguna)
 Suntrust Ecotown (Megaworld) 350 hectares — Tanza
 Arden Botanical Estate (Megaworld) 251 hectares — Trece Martires and Tanza
 Evo City (Ayala Land) 250 hectares — Kawit
 South Forbes City (Cathay Land) 250 hectares — Silang
 Golden Horizon (HG-III Construction and Development Corp.) 250 hectares — Trece Martires 
 SM Smart City (SM Development Corp.) 200 hectares — Carmona
 NOMO Garden City (Vista Land) 180 hectares  — Bacoor
 Antel Grand (Antel Holdings) 170 hectares  — General Trias
 Maple Grove (Megaworld) 140 hectares  — General Trias
 Stanza (Vista Land) 110 hectares — Tanza
 Crosswinds (Vista Land) 100 hectares — Tagaytay
 Mallorca City (Cathay Land) 100 hectares — Silang and Carmona
 POGO City (PAGCOR) 70 hectares — Kawit
 Idesia City (Hankyu Hanshin Holdings Inc. and P.A. Properties) 37 hectares — Dasmariñas
 Crest Key Estates (Cathay Land) 19 hectares — Silang
Praverde Dasmariñas (Vista Land) 12 hectares — Dasmariñas

Tourism

Tagaytay serves as the main tourist center in the province. Historical attraction and sites are Fort San Felipe and Sangley Point, both in Cavite City; Corregidor Island; General Trias; Calero Bridge, Noveleta; Battle of Alapan Marker and Flag in Imus; Zapote Bridge in Bacoor; Battle of Binakayan Monument in Kawit; Tejeros Convention Site in Rosario; and Aguinaldo Shrine, the site of the declaration of Philippine Independence in Kawit. Several old churches stand as glorious reminders of how the Catholic faith has blossomed in the Province of Cavite.  Existing museums include Geronimo de los Reyes Museum, General Trias; Museo De La Salle, Dasmariñas; Philippine Navy Museum, Cavite City; Baldomero Aguinaldo Museum, Kawit; and Cavite City Library Museum, Cavite City. There are eight world-class golf courses in the province. Natural wonders are mostly found in the upland areas such as Tagaytay Ridge, Macabag Cave in Maragondon, Balite Falls in Amadeo, Malibiclibic Falls in General Aguinaldo-Magallanes border, Mts. Palay-Palay and Mataas na Gulod National Park in Ternate and Maragondon, Sitio Buhay Unclassified Forest in Magallanes and flowers, vegetables and coffee farms.

The Aguinaldo Shrine and Museum in Kawit is where the independence of the Philippines was proclaimed on June 12, 1898, by General Aguinaldo, the Philippines' first president. The multi-level structure includes a mezzanine and tower, and spans 14,000 square feet. Today, the ground floor serves as a museum, which houses historical artifacts. The tomb of Aguinaldo lies in a garden behind the house.

The Andrés Bonifacio House in General Trias is the former home of the country's revolutionary leader. The site of his court martial in Maragondon is also preserved.
Other historical sites include the Battle of Alapan and Battle of Julian Bridge Markers, the House of Tirona, and Fort San Felipe.

The main churches of the province are the Imus Cathedral, San Roque Parish in Cavite City where the miraculous image of Nuestra Señora de la Soledad de Porta Vaga enshrined., Bacoor, Silang, Naic, Dasmariñas, Tanza, Ternate, Indang, General Trias, Kawit and Maragondon Catholic Churches. The Shrines of Our Lady of La Salette in Silang, and St. Anne, Tagaytay, also attract pilgrims.

Corregidor is an island fortress where Filipino and American forces fought against the Japanese invaders in 1942. It has become a tourist attraction with tunnels, cannons and other war structures still well-preserved. The famous line of General Douglas MacArthur said is associated with Corregidor: "I shall return!"

There are first class hotels, inns and lodging houses to accommodate both foreign and local tourists. Conference facilities can be found in several convention centers, hotels and resorts in the province. Restaurants and specialty dining places offer mushroom dishes, native delicacies and exotic cuisines. Seafoods, fruits, coffee, organic vegetables, tinapa, handicrafts, ornamental plants also abound in the province.

Mountain climbing is also one of the outdoor activities in Cavite. This includes Mount Pico De Loro which is within the towns of Ternate and Maragondon (and some parts of it are already part of Batangas), which is a part of the Palay-Palay and Mataas na Gulod protected landscape. Mt. Pico De Loro is the highest part of Cavite at 664 meters above sea level and is noted for its 360-degree view at its summit and a cliff known as Parrot's Beak or Monolith that mountaineers would also like to climb. Mt. Marami, within the same mountain range, located at Magallanes town is also a mountaineering location due to its "silyang bato" (en. Chair of rocks) at its summit.

There are twenty-two accredited tourism establishments and three accredited tour guides. There are also tour packages being arranged with the Department of Tourism. Centuries old traditions and the very rich culture of Cavite have been the source of great pride to Caviteños.

Transportation

During the Spanish colonial period, Cavite hosted the principal port of Manila and served as the country's gateway to the world.

In the mid-19th century, Cavite, particularly the Cavite Peninsula in the north, was a stop for ships from South America before free trade opened up.

Roads
Of these, the  national roads are mostly paved with concrete or asphalt and are relatively in good condition with some portions in need of rehabilitation. Most of these roads are concrete, some are paved with asphalt and the rest remain gravel roads. Majority of the municipal/city roads are paved with concrete, while barangay roads consist of 46.7% concrete and asphalt roads and 53.3% earth and gravel roads.

There are three main highways traversing the province: Aguinaldo Highway runs in a general north–south direction which includes the Tagaytay–Nasugbu Highway segment in the south; the Governor's Drive runs in a general east–west direction; the Antero Soriano Highway runs within the coastal towns on the northwest.

In 1985, the Cavite Expressway (CAVITEx) was opened, which lessened the heavy volume of vehicles on Aguinaldo Highway in Bacoor. This project decreased the traffic congestion in Aguinaldo Highway in Bacoor, so travel time from Imus to Baclaran/Pasay is lessened to only one hour.

The road is expected to reduce travel time by an average of 45 minutes from Daang Hari to Alabang Interchange as well as decongest traffic in Cavite, Las Piñas and Muntinlupa.

Currently, Cavite province is served by three DPWH offices: Cavite 1st, Cavite 2nd and Cavite Sub District Engineering Offices.

Proposed/ongoing transportation projects

Sangley International Airport
The Department of Transportation had "no objection" to an offer building a  airport complex on reclaimed land in Sangley Point. The upcoming international airport was pursued as a joint venture between investors, including Chinese enterprises, and the Cavite LGU.

Cavite–Laguna and Cavite–Tagaytay–Batangas Expressways
The Cavite–Laguna Expressway (CALAEx) is an under-construction expressway that will cross the provinces of Cavite and Laguna in the Philippines. When constructed, it is expected to ease the traffic in the Cavite–Laguna region, particularly in Aguinaldo Highway, Santa Rosa–Tagaytay Road and Governor's Drive.

Cavite–Tagaytay–Batangas Expressway is also a proposed expressway connects with CALAEx from Silang, Cavite to Nasugbu, Batangas. CTBEx is a future alternative route for tourists going to Tagaytay and Nasugbu.

LRT Line 1 South Extension Project
The LRT Line 1 South Extension Project or Cavite Extension Project through southern Metro Manila to the Province of Cavite has been identified as an integral link of the Rail Transit Network by Metro Manila Urban Transportation Integration Study (MMUTIS). It is one of the priority projects of the Department of Transportation and Communications (DOTC) and LRTA. It is also a flagship project of the Office of the President.

The project aims to expand the existing LRT Line 1 service southward to the cities of Parañaque, Las Piñas and the city of Bacoor in the Cavite Province. The  route of the light railway system that will start from Baclaran to Niog was planned to carry a capacity of 40,000 passengers per direction per hour. The extension will have 48 air-conditioned coaches, 12-four car trains, 8 passenger stations and a satellite depot in Cavite. The groundbreaking of LRT Line 1 South Extension Project was held on Thursday, May 4, 2017. The actual construction officially started on Tuesday, May 7, 2019, because the Right-of-way is "free and clear" from obstructions. Once it is fully operational, Cavite will be served by the LRT-1 (via Niog station). The extension is slated for partial operations by late 2024 or early 2025 and full operations by second quarter of 2027. This is the second project outside Metro Manila after the planned MRT-7 that starts from North Avenue, Quezon City and it will end in San Jose Del Monte, Bulacan. The said project will serve approximately 1.9 million commuters based in Pasay, Paranaque, Las Piñas and Bacoor.

LRT Line 6 Project
The proposed LRT Line 6 project would further extend the LRT system by another 19 kilometers all the way to Dasmariñas from the proposed end in Niog in Bacoor, Cavite.

The mass transit system would pass along the Aguinaldo Highway and would have stations in Niog, Tirona station, Imus station, Daang Hari station, Salitran station, Congressional Avenue station, and Governor's Drive station. The project will improve passenger mobility and reduce the volume of vehicular traffic in the Cavite area by providing a higher capacity mass transit system. It also aims to spur economic development along the extension corridor.

Ferry services
There is one ferry service: Metrostar Ferry, from Cavite City to SM Mall of Asia in Pasay.

Government

Governor 

 Juanito Victor Remulla (NUP)

Vice Governor 
 Athena Tolentino (National Unity Party)

Board members

Ex-officio members

House of Representatives

Notable people

National heroes and patriots 

Emilio Aguinaldo, First President of the Philippines
Mariano Álvarez, Philippine Revolutionary General
Mariano Trias, Philippine Revolutionary General
Pascual Álvarez, Philippine Revolutionary General
Santiago Álvarez, Philippine Revolutionary General
Baldomero Aguinaldo, Philippine Revolutionary General
Crispulo Aguinaldo, Philippine Revolutionary General
Licerio Topacio, Philippine Revolutionary General
Tomás Mascardo, Philippine Revolutionary General
Mariano Noriel, served as general under Emilio Aguinaldo's revolutionary army during the 1896 Philippine Revolution
José Tagle, Filipino military officer who participated in the Battle of Imus during the Philippine Revolution.
Julián Felipe, composer of the Philippine National Anthem & Reina de Cavite
Román Basa, Second president of the Katipunan
Ladislao Diwa, one of the founders of Katipunan
Thirteen Martyrs of Cavite, Filipino patriots
Felipe Calderón y Roca, lawyer, considered the Father of the Malolos Constitution
Mariano Castañeda, Cavite Governor 1944, General of the Filipino-American Cavite Guerilla Forces FACGF the liberators of Cavite during the Japanese Occupation and Chief of Staff of the Armed Forces of the Philippines in 1947.

Science and education 

Olivia Salamanca, Filipino physician who trained in the United States at the Woman's Medical College of Pennsylvania in Philadelphia and was the second female physician from the Philippines.
Paulo C. Campos, National Scientist of the Philippines for Nuclear Medicine
Hilario Lara, National Scientist of the Philippines for Public Health  
Jose R. Velasco, National Scientist of the Philippines for Plant Physiology
Lourdes J. Cruz, National Scientist of the Philippines for Biochemistry
Francisca Tirona, educator, humanitarian, civic leader, and administrator, and co-founder of the Philippine Women's University.  
Nemesio Prudente, educator, political activist, and human rights defender revered for serving as President of the Polytechnic University of the Philippines.

Literature and the arts 

Pascual H. Poblete, revolutionary and writer
Alejandro G. Abadilla, poet, Father of Modern Philippine Poetry
Rogelio Ordoñez, multi-awarded Filipino fiction writer, poet, activist, journalist and educator
Efren Abueg, novelist, short story writer, essayist, fictionist
Fidel Rillo, poet, editor, book designer
Mars Ravelo, graphic novelist
Eros Atalia, author, professor and journalist
Wilfredo Alicdan, artist
George Canseco, composer, songwriter
Josefino Cenizal, composer

Religion 

Cardinal Luis Antonio Tagle, Archbishop Emeritus of Manila, Bishop Emeritus of the Diocese of Imus, President of Caritas Internationalis and Prefect of the Congregation for the Evangelization of Peoples 
Archbishop Rolando Joven Tria Tirona, Archbishop of the Archdiocese of Caceres and Bishop Emeritus of Prelature of Infanta and Diocese of Malolos
 Bishop Cirilo Almario, Second bishop of the Roman Catholic Diocese of Malolos

Politics and government 

Cesar Virata, former prime minister of the Philippines
Serafin R. Cuevas, 106th Associate Justice of the Supreme Court of the Philippines and 50th Secretary of the Department of Justice
Jose Portugal Perez, 167th Associate Justice of the Supreme Court of the Philippines
Jose C. Mendoza, 168th Associate Justice of the Supreme Court of the Philippines
Antero Soriano, former senator and former Cavite governor
Justiniano S. Montano, former senator and representative 6th District of Cavite
Ramon Revilla Sr., actor and former Senator
Panfilo Lacson, senator and 7th Chief of the Philippine National Police
Bong Revilla, actor, Senator, former Cavite governor, and vice governor
Francis Tolentino, Senator, former Metropolitan Manila Development Authority chairman and mayor of Tagaytay
Manuel Earnshaw, former Resident Commissioner to the U.S. House of Representatives from the Philippine Islands
Leonides Sarao Virata, 15th Secretary of the Department of Trade and Industry
Epimaco Velasco, 16th Secretary of the Department of the Interior and Local Government, former NBI director and  former Cavite governor
Joseph Emilio Abaya, former Department of Transportation and Communications secretary and former representative 1st District of Cavite
Irineo "Ayong" Maliksi, PCSO chairman, former Representative 3rd District of Cavite, former Cavite Governor and former City Mayor of Imus
Leon Guinto, former mayor of the City of Manila during the Japanese occupation
Lani Mercado, actress, Bacoor city mayor and former representative of the 2nd congressional district of Cavite 
Gilbert Remulla, TV host, news anchor, reporter, former representative the 1st congressional district of Cavite
Strike Revilla, Representative 2nd District of Cavite former councilor & mayor of Bacoor and former Cavite board member & former PCSO chairman
Abraham Tolentino, politician, sportsperson

Philanthropy 

Efren Peñaflorida, CNN Hero of the Year for 2009.
Luis Yangco, Filipino-Chinese businessman and philanthropist

Entertainment 

Leopoldo Salcedo, actor
Celeste Legaspi, singer, actress
Bayani Agbayani, comedian, TV host
Jasmine Trias, sensational singer; American Idol grand champion 3rd runner up
Louise delos Reyes, actress
Bella Santiago, singer
Christian Bables, actor
Kaye Abad, actress
Nash Aguas, Actor and Star Circle Kid Quest Grand Questor
Arra San Agustin, actress
Christian Bautista, singer, actor, and host
Miguel Tanfelix, actor
Bugoy Cariño, Child Actor
Olivia Cenizal, actress
Lyca Gairanod, The Voice Kids (Philippines season 1) Champion
Seth Fedelin, actor
Roxanne Guinoo, actress and Star Circle Teen Quest Finalist 
Diether Ocampo, actor, singer, and model
Sugar Mercado, actress, former SexBomb Girls member
Marcelito Pomoy, singer, Pilipinas Got Talent grand winner
Marian Rivera, actress

Sports 

Wesley So, chess grandmaster and 8th youngest chess grandmaster in history
Joseph Eric Buhain, chairman of the Philippines' Games and Amusement Board. swimmer
Terrence Romeo, Professional basketball player in the Philippine Basketball Association (PBA). Currently playing for the GlobalPort Batang Pier and Gilas Pilipinas. Former college player of the FEU Tamaraws
Ranidel de Ocampo, Professional basketball player in the Philippine Basketball Association, currently plays for the Talk 'N Text Tropang Texters
Yancy de Ocampo, athlete

Others 

Leonardo Manicio, aka Nardong Putik Filipino gangster turned folk hero

Notes

References

External links 

 
 
 

 
Provinces of the Philippines
Provinces of Calabarzon
States and territories established in 1614
1614 establishments in the Philippines